"My Life (Throw it Away If I Want To)" is an American country music song written and recorded by Bill Anderson.

Release and reception 
Upon its release, Billboard noted that the song was a "compelling, original rhythm ballad" and a "strong entry."

Chart performance
Originally released in February 1969, "My Life" became Anderson's fourth solo No. 1 song on the Billboard Hot Country Singles chart on May 17, 1969. It spent two weeks atop that chart and charted for 19 weeks total, and was ultimately named Billboard's No. 1 country song of 1969.

Sources

1969 singles
1969 songs
Bill Anderson (singer) songs
Billboard Hot Country Songs number-one singles of the year
Songs written by Bill Anderson (singer)
Decca Records singles